Tuva Livsdatter Syvertsen (born 16 July 1983) is a Norwegian musician (vocals, hardingfele and accordion). She was born in Oslo but grew up at Brønnøya. Syvertsen is known from a number of album releases and cooperations with Hildegunn Øiseth, Aasmund Nordstoga, DumDum Boys and as a leading figure of Valkyrien Allstars.

Career 

Syvertsen is best known as a fiddle player, singer and front figure of the band Valkyrien Allstars, together with Ola Hilmen and Erik Sollid.

In 2010 she participated at the show Det store korslaget on Norwegian television TV 2, and she busted out in 3rd episode of the program.
In 2012 she participated in the show Stjernekamp on NRK1.

Personal life 
As of 2012, Syvertsen had been in a cohabiting relationship with another woman for the last two years.

Honors 
Grappas debutant Award 2006, within Valkyrien Allstars
Commission for Telemarkfestivalen 2012, together with Susanna Wallumrød

Discography 

Within Valkyrien Allstars
2007: Valkyrien Allstars (Heilo)
2009: To Måner (Heilo)
2011: Ingen Hverdag (Heilo)
2014: Farvel Slekt Og Venner (Heilo)

With other prosjects
2008: Gangsterpolka (Grappa Music), with "Ompakara»
2008: Spelferd heim (Djønno Records), with Rannveig Djønne
2009: Hildring, with Hildegunn Øiseth
2009: Ein visefugg (Warner Music), with Aasmund Nordstoga
2011: Chapels and Bars (Bluestown), with Rita Engedalen
2012: Ti Liv (Oh Yeah!), with DumDum Boys
2012: Broken Soul Blues (Bluestown), with Margit Bakken & Rita Engedalen
2018: Go Dig My Grave (Susanna), with Susanna Wallumrød

References

External links 
 Valkyrien Allstars Official Website

1983 births
Living people
Musicians from Asker
Norwegian violinists
Norwegian LGBT singers
Norwegian lesbian musicians
Lesbian singers
21st-century Norwegian women singers
21st-century violinists